Khalifa is a 1976 Hindi film, produced by Jeetendra Luthra and directed by Prakash Mehra. The film stars Randhir Kapoor, Rekha, Pran, I. S. Johar, Madan Puri and Lalita Pawar.

Plot
Rajendra is a conman. He promises his girlfriend marriage after finding out about her pregnancy. He leaves his girlfriend, taking away all her savings.  Kamla commits suicide. Kamla's brother Vikram decides to kill Rajendra. Vinod, who is of a good character, now encounters his look-alike Rajendra. Hence, Vinod's life is now in a complicated situation. Eventually, all confusion is solved and the movie leads to a happy ending.

Cast
 Randhir Kapoor ... Vinod / Rajendra 
 Rekha ... Rekha 
 Pran ... Vikram
 I. S. Johar ... Diwan Manoharlal Agnihotri 
 Madan Puri ... Dharamdas Sharma  
 Lalita Pawar ... Ganga Devi 
 Sonia Sahni ... Sweety 
 Urmila Bhatt ... Shanta D. Sharma 
 Praveen Paul ... Mrs. Agnihotri 
 Jankidas ... Harihar
 Arpana Choudhary ... Kamla

Soundtrack
 "Dekh Tujhko Dil Ne Kaha" (Part 1) - Kishore Kumar, Asha Bhosle
 "Dekh Tujhko Dil Ne Kaha" (Part 2) - Instrumental 
 "Dil Machal Raha Hai" - Kishore Kumar, Asha Bhosle
 "Tak Dhin Tak" (Part 1) - Kishore Kumar, Manna Dey
 "Tak Dhin Tak" (Part 2) - Kishore Kumar, Manna Dey
 "Meri Arz Suno Banwari" - Manna Dey
 "Dil Machal Raha Hai" - Instrumental

References

1976 films
1970s Hindi-language films
Films directed by Prakash Mehra
Films scored by R. D. Burman